Kieran Donnelly (born 1975/1976) is an Irish Gaelic football coach and former player. He has been manager of the Fermanagh county team since 2021.

Career
Donnelly played inter-county football for Fermanagh. He made his debut for Fermanagh under Tyrone native Pat King in 1996, and went on to win an All-Ireland Senior B Championship and a Dr McKenna Cup, went toe-to-toe with Cavan the year they won the 1997 Ulster Senior Football Championship Final, and played in Division 1 of the National Football League under managers Dominic Corrigan and John Maughan.

After playing for Fermanagh, Donnelly managed the minor team and also helped train the senior side when Peter Canavan was in charge. Donnelly worked under Canavan when Canavan was Fermanagh manager. Donnelly was in fact Fermanagh assistant manager when Canavan was there.

Before he became Fermanagh manager, Donnelly managed Scotstown to the 2018 Ulster Senior Club Football Championship final. It is hard work being manager of Fermanagh. Fermanagh has not yet won an Ulster Senior Football Championship. Immediately before his appointment as Fermanagh manager, Donnelly was working with Cavan Gaels.

Personal life
Donnelly is a native of Brookeborough. When he was appointed as Fermanagh manager in 2021, Donnelly was 45 years of age and had spent 21 years teaching at Omagh CBS. He has coached the school team.

References

1970s births
Living people
Fermanagh inter-county Gaelic footballers
Gaelic football coaches
Gaelic football managers